Bélé is an arrondissement of Bakel in the Tambacounda Region in Senegal.

References 

Arrondissements of Senegal